This Land is the fifth album by Bill Frisell to be released on the Elektra Nonesuch label. It was released in 1994 and features performances by Frisell, alto saxophonist Billy Drewes, trombonist Curtis Fowlkes, clarinetist Don Byron, bassist Kermit Driscoll and drummer Joey Baron.

Reception
The Allmusic review by Glenn Astarita awarded the album 4 stars, stating, "The guitarist's now familiar penchant for constructing climactic opuses framed upon his deft utilization of volume control and often-slithery mode of attack counterbalances the horn sections' pumping notes and harmonious choruses. Essentially, melody is the key throughout these pleasantly arranged pieces, as Frisell makes his axe talk and cry while also partaking in lustrous unison lines with Don Byron (clarinet), Curtis Fowlkes (trombone), and Billy Drewes (alto sax). Overall, This Land signifies yet another powerful statement by this wonderfully inventive musician. Recommended!".

Track listing
All compositions by Bill Frisell except as indicated.
 "Is it Sweet?" – 5:05
 "Strange Meeting" – 6:18
 "Jimmy Carter" (Part 1) – 2:03
 "Jimmy Carter" (Part 2) – 5:22
 "This Land" – 3:15
 "Dog Eat Dog" – 4:17
 "Amarillo Barbados" – 4:13
 "Monica Jane" – 4:59
 "Resistor" – 6:56
 "Julius Hemphill" – 9:53
 "Unscientific Americans" – 0:46
 "Cartoon" – 6:22
 "Rag" – 4:18
 "Tag" (Frisell, Baron) – 1:45

Personnel
 Bill Frisell – guitar
 Don Byron – clarinet and bass clarinet
 Billy Drewes – alto saxophone
 Curtis Fowlkes – trombone
 Kermit Driscoll – electric and acoustic basses
 Joey Baron – drums

References 

1994 albums
Bill Frisell albums
Nonesuch Records albums